Peter Bubner was an Australian rules footballer who played in the South Australian National Football League for the Central District Football Club and Sturt Football Club from 1980 to 1992.

See also
 Australian rules football positions
 List of Australian rules football clubs
 List of Australian rules football rivalries
 List of Australian rules football terms

References

Australian rules footballers from South Australia
Living people
South Australian State of Origin players
Place of birth missing (living people)
Year of birth missing (living people)